Nugaal-Gibin is a District in the Mudug region of Puntland state of Somalia. It lies approximately 40 km southeast of the city of Galdogob. The town is populated by the Xirsi Muumin subclan of Leelkase, and other Mumin Adan clans. The city has a population of approximately 50,000, mainly pastorals living in the rural areas of the town. Nugaal-Gibin has a primary school, MCH health center, and water wells.

References

Populated places in Mudug